Phillip Ashley Blizzard (born 6 February 1958 in Burnie, Tasmania) was an Australian cricket player, who played for Tasmania. He was a right-handed batsman and left arm fast-medium bowler who represented Tasmania from 1979 until 1984. He also played in one season for New South Wales.

See also
 List of Tasmanian representative cricketers
 List of New South Wales representative cricketers

External links
Cricinfo Profile

Australian cricketers
Tasmania cricketers
1958 births
Living people
People from Burnie, Tasmania
Cricketers from Tasmania
New South Wales cricketers